DAFC is an abbreviation that may refer to:
Davao Aguilas F.C.
Dover Athletic F.C.
Dromore Amateurs F.C.
Dunfermline Athletic F.C.